Elelwani is a 2012 South African drama film directed by Ntshavheni wa Luruli. It won awards for Achievement in Production Design and Best Actress in a Leading Role for Masebe at the 9th Africa Movie Academy Awards. It was selected as the South African entry for the Best Foreign Language Film at the 87th Academy Awards, but was not nominated.

Cast
 Florence Masebe as Elelwani
 Vusi Kunene as Prince Thovele
 Mutodi Neshehe

See also
 List of submissions to the 87th Academy Awards for Best Foreign Language Film
 List of South African submissions for the Academy Award for Best Foreign Language Film

References

External links
 

2012 films
2012 drama films
Venda-language films
Best Production Design Africa Movie Academy Award winners
South African drama films